Kevin Schumacher (born 24 December 1997) is a German professional footballer who plays as a winger for  club Hansa Rostock.

FC Germania Egestorf/Langreder in 2016 after 26 goals in 30 games for Bad Pyrmont. In summer 2018, he signed for Werder Bremen II, also in the Regionalliga Nord. After two seasons with Werder Bremen II, he joined TSV Havelse before signing for 2. Bundesliga club Hansa Rostock in summer 2021.

Career

Youth and amateur
Schumacher began his youth career at BW Salzhemmendorf at the age of 5. He progressed through all the youth teams at the club up to A-Youth level. Schumacher was part of the Bad Pyrmont side promoted to the Fußball-Landesliga Niedersachsen in 2016 as champions of the Bezirksliga Hannover Staffel 4. He was also their top scorer with 26 goals in 30 matches and attracted the interest of other clubs. Despite initial disagreement between the two clubs over the transfer fee due, he signed for Regionalliga Nord side 1. FC Germania Egestorf/Langreder in July 2016.

Under coach Jan Zimmermann, Schumacher debuted on 3 August 2016 in a 3–0 defeat to VfV 06 Hildesheim in the Lower Saxony Cup quarter-final, with Schumacher making his Regionalliga debut three days later, coming on as a 70th minute substitute for Christoph Beismann in a 4–0 defeat to VfB Lübeck. He scored his first goal of the season on matchday 10 with the third goal of a 4–0 victory over SV Eichede. Over the course of the season, Schumacher scored 4 goals in 32 league matches as Germania achieved a 10th-placed league finish. He scored 7 in 33 league games the following season, missing just one game through suspension as the club finished 5th in the league table.

In summer 2018, Schumacher signed for fellow Regionalliga Nord side Werder Bremen II. He made his debut for the club in the opening game of the season, starting in a 0–0 draw with VfL Wolfsburg II. He scored his first goal for the club in a 4–0 win over Hamburger SV II during the third matchday. Schumacher made 26 appearances and scored 4 goals as Werder Bremen II finished 3rd in the Regionalliga Nord. He scored once in 18 games across the 2019–20 season, which was cut short due to the COVID-19 pandemic. He left Werder Bremen reserves at the end of the season.

In June 2020, Schumacher signed a one-year contract TSV Havelse, reuniting him with former Egestorf/Langreder coach Jan Zimmermann. Schumacher made his debut for Havelse on 23 August 2020 against BSV Rehden in the Lower Saxony Cup final, which was originally due to be played in May 2020; Havelse won 4–1. Schumacher scored once in 9 league matches prior to the suspension of the season in November 2020. The league season was cancelled in April 2021 with Havelse qualifying for the promotion play-offs after the top teams in both groups of the Regionalliga Nord did not apply for a 3. Liga license. Schumacher played in both legs of the play-off against 1. FC Schweinfurt 05 with Havelse promoted to the 3. Liga after both legs were won 1–0 with Schumacher having scored Havelse's second leg goal.

Hansa Rostock
On 2 July 2021, Schumacher joined Hansa Rostock on a two-year contract. Under Hansa coach Jens Härtel, he made his professional debut on 24 July 2021 in a 3–1 home defeat to Karlsruher SC. He made 22 2. Bundesliga appearances across the 2021–22 season.

Honours
SpVgg Bad Pyrmont
 Bezirksliga Hannover Staffel 4: 2016

TSV Havelse
 Lower Saxony Cup: 2020

References

External links

 
 

1997 births
Living people
German footballers
People from Hameln-Pyrmont
Footballers from Lower Saxony
Association football wingers
1. FC Germania Egestorf/Langreder players
SV Werder Bremen II players
TSV Havelse players
FC Hansa Rostock players
2. Bundesliga players
Regionalliga players